netzpolitik.org is a German language news website on digital rights and digital culture. Among other topics, it covers mass surveillance, open source software, data protection and privacy and net neutrality. The blog was founded in 2002 by Markus Beckedahl, who still leads the project today, supported by more than 30 other contributors.

Treason investigation 2015 

In Spring 2015, netzpolitik.org leaked internal government documents which detailed the proposed surveillance expansion of social networks by the Federal Office for the Protection of the Constitution, an intelligence agency, by producing two articles, first in February 2015 and then in April 2015.

On July 31, 2015, netzpolitik.org announced:Today, we received a letter from the Federal Attorney General of Germany confirming ongoing investigations against our reporters Markus Beckedahl, Andre Meister and an “unknown” source, suspecting us of treason according to the German Penal Code.Up until that point, they were known to have been witnesses in the case, but this letter confirmed that they would be investigated as "joint principals".

The last time such charges were brought against a journalist in Germany was in 1962 amid much uproar, when the editor-in-chief of Der Spiegel was accused of treason for publishing secret documents about the German defense forces, and spent 103 days in prison (see Spiegel affair).

In the aftermath of the treason investigation, Federal Minister of Justice Heiko Maas forced Public Prosecutor General Harald Range into retirement for breach of public trust on 4 August 2015.

Political views
The bloggers describe themselves as a platform for digital freedoms, specifically fighting against mass surveillance. netzpolitik.org is extensively reporting on the ongoing intelligence scandals, consequently live-covering the German parliamentary investigation committee on NSA surveillance. Besides this live-blogging, there is a broad evaluation and commenting on the insights won in the committee. The bloggers have vigorously criticized surveillance laws and practices for many years.

References

External links 
 netzpolitik.org
 „Suspicion of Treason“: Federal Attorney General Announces Investigation Against Us In Addition To Our Sources, 2015-7-30

Press review: Treason Investigation 2015 
 BBC: German spy leaks website being investigated, 2015-7-30
 eff.org: German Investigation of Netzpolitik For Coverage of Leaked Surveillance Documents Confirmed, 2015-7-30
 arstechnica.com: After publishing secret spy docs, German news site investigated for treason, 2015-7-30
 The Register: German spooks want to charge journalists with TREASON for publishing spy plans, 2015-7-31
 boingboing.net: German prosecutors give spies a walk, but investigate journalists for "treason", 2015-7-31
 techdirt: Yes, German Authorities Are Pushing Treason Charges Against Netzpolitik For Publishing Surveillance Plans, 2015-7-31
 The Intercept: German Journalists Investigated for Treason after Publishing Surveillance Leaks, 2015-7-31
 Deutsche Welle: German press, politicians criticize 'absurd' Netzpolitik inquiry, 2015-7-31
 New York Times: Germany Suspends Treason Probe Against News Website, 2015-7-31

German political websites
Mass surveillance
Net neutrality
German-language websites
Publications established in 2002